The 1917–18 Georgetown Hoyas men's basketball team represented Georgetown University during the 1917–18 NCAA college basketball season. John O'Reilly coached the team in his fourth season as head coach. Georgetown was an independent and played its home games at Ryan Gymnasium on the Georgetown campus in Washington, D.C., and finished the season with a record of 8-6.

Season recap
Although the Hoyas struggled on the road this year, their home winning streak at Ryan Gymnasium reached eight games at the end of the season, dating back to a victory against Bucknell on the last day of the previous season; it would reach 52 before finally coming to an end during the 1923-24 season. Georgetown also defeated crosstown rival George Washington twice this season, giving the Hoyas an eight-game winning streak against George Washington – seven of the wins at Ryan Gymnasium – dating back to 1915.

Forward Fred Fees, a Georgetown University Law School student, was in his second season with the Hoyas. A free-throw shooting specialist in an era when the rules of college basketball allowed teams to choose which player shot its free throws, Fees exploited his free-throw prowess to establish himself as one of the top scorers in college basketball in the United States in each of his seasons with the Hoyas. This season he played in 11 games and scored 201 points, the most by any college player in the country, and his 18.3 points per game set a Georgetown single-season record that would stand until the 1958-59 season. In the game at Navy on January 23, 1918, he scored 15 of the Hoyas's 17 points.

Roster

Sources

Georgetown players did not wear numbers on their jerseys this season. The first numbered jerseys in Georgetown men's basketball history would not appear until the 1933-34 season.

Freshman forward Bill Dudack later served as the Hoyas' head coach during the 1929-30 season. Sophomore guard Alexander "Pat" Finnegan left school after the season for United States Army service in World War I and while in military service died of influenza — the so-called "Spanish flu" — during the 1918–1919 influenza pandemic.

1917–18 schedule and results
Sources

It was common practice at this time for colleges and universities to include non-collegiate opponents in their schedules, with the games recognized as part of their official record for the season, so the games against a United States Army team from Camp Meade, Maryland, a United States Army Amphibious Corps team, and the Georgetown University Medical School counted as part of Georgetown's won-loss record for 1917–18. It was not until 1952, after the completion of the 1951–52 season, that the National Collegiate Athletic Association (NCAA) ruled that colleges and universities could no longer count games played against non-collegiate opponents in their annual won-loss records.

Trinity College of North Carolina was the future Duke University.

|-
!colspan=9 style="background:#002147; color:#8D817B;"| Regular Season

Notes

References

Georgetown Hoyas men's basketball seasons
Georgetown
Georgetown Hoyas men's basketball team
Georgetown Hoyas men's basketball team